Hugo: Bukkazoom! is a 2003 racing video game developed by ITE Media and published by Namco for Game Boy Advance and ITE Media for PlayStation 2 and Microsoft Windows. The game is part of the famous Hugo series. The game was released in 2003 for Microsoft Windows, Game Boy Advance, and PlayStation 2.

Development
The game was showcased at E3 2003.

Reception

The game was poorly reviewed. Absolute Games concluded that Hugo: Bukkazoom! "fell short of being an interesting game". Jeuxvideo.com criticized the controls which "made the gameplay too random", but noted that "if the controls were done more precise and better thought out, Hugo: Bukkazoom could have interested fans of kart racing.

References

External links

 Hugo: Bukkazoom! at PCGamingWiki
 Hugo Bukkazoom! at Hugo-Troll.de (German)
 Hugo: Bukkazoom! at Square Faction (Russian)

2003 video games
Game Boy Advance games
Game Boy Advance-only games
PlayStation 2 games
Racing video games
Multiplayer and single-player video games
Video games developed in Denmark
Windows games